Uppukandam Brothers Back in Action is a 2011 Malayalam film, it stars  Srikanth, Honey Rose and Babu Antony in main role. It is a sequel to the 1993 film Uppukandam Brothers. The film received negative reviews. It was later dubbed and released in Tamil as Chatriya Vamsam.

Cast

 Srikanth as Uppukandam Bobby 
 Honey Rose as Sreelakshmi
 Vani Viswanath as Kochammini
 Babu Antony as Uppukandam Sevichan
 Jagadish as Uppukandam Josekutty (Joychan)
 Baiju as Uppukandam Bennychan
 Captain Raju as Uppukandam Kariyachan
 Mohanraj as Uppukandam Paulachan
 Sukumaran as Uppukandam Kora
 Catherine Tresa as Vinila Sathyaneshan
 Richard Rishi as Ettuveetil Ganeshan
 Jagathi Sreekumar as Kunjeesho
 Seema as Uppukandam Kunjannamma
 Suraj Venjaramoodu as D. Damodaran Thampi
 Harisree Asokan as 'Aakri' Shaji
 Ravi Vallathol as Kuttan Marar
 Narayanankutty as Soman
 Rajmohan Unnithan as Srampikkal Sathyaneshan
 Kanakalatha as Sathyaneshan's Wife Savithri
 Shameer Khan as Seban Kora Uppukandam
 Sujibala
 Shabnam as Kunjeesho's Wife
 Kalady Omana

Music
"Ishtam Ninnishtam" - Manjari, Karthik
"Saronin Geetham" - Madhu Balakrishnan, Afsal, Elizabeth Raju
"Thilakkam Vacha" - Shankar Mahadevan
"Thilakkkam Vacha (Remix)" - Shankar Mahadevan
"Ventheerathu" - Rashmi Vijayan

References

External links
 
 Srikanth debuts in Malayalam 

Indian action films
2011 action films
2011 films
2010s Malayalam-language films
Indian sequel films
Uppukandam2
Films scored by Alphons Joseph
Films directed by T. S. Suresh Babu